Saleev or Saleyev is a Russian masculine surname, its feminine counterpart is Saleeva or Saleyeva. Notable people with the surname include:

 Evgeny Saleev (born 1989), Russian wrestler

Russian-language surnames